Takeley railway station was a station serving the Hockerill area of Takeley in Bishop's Stortford, England.

History
The railway line through Takeley was built by the Bishop's Stortford, Dunmow and Braintree Railway (BSD&BR). The line, including Takeley station, was opened on 22 February 1869, and on the same day the BSD&BR company was absorbed by the Great Eastern Railway.

Regular services ended on 3 March 1952, but the station was not formally closed until after August 1961.

The station along with almost all the intermediate stations on the Bishop's Stortford-Braintree branch were little used. The station is extremely close to the  station Stane Street, so it was very little used. Takeley had a single platform on the north side of the line. There was a substantial brick building including stationmaster's house, booking office, waiting room and lamp room. There was a small goods yard, also on the north side with a 240' siding used mainly by coal merchants. A second siding also served a D.A. Fyfe and Sons warehouse. A signal box was located on the up side of the line. Although the station closed to passengers in 1952 August Bank Holiday excursions continued to use the line until 1964. Takeley closed completely in 1966 but the line through the station remained in operation for freight traffic until 1971.

It closed to passengers along with the rest of the branch because it was uneconomic.

References

Further reading

External links
 Takeley station on navigable 1946 O. S. map

 

Disused railway stations in Essex
Former Great Eastern Railway stations
Railway stations in Great Britain opened in 1869
Railway stations in Great Britain closed in 1952
1869 establishments in England
Takeley